The 2020 Northeast Conference men's basketball tournament was the postseason men's basketball tournament for the Northeast Conference for the 2019–20 NCAA Division I men's basketball season. All tournament games are played at the home arena of the highest seed. The tournament took place March 4–10, 2020.

Seeds
The top eight teams in the Northeast Conference are eligible to compete in the conference tournament. Teams will be seeded by record within the conference, with a tiebreaker system to seed teams with identical conference records.
Note: Merrimack College joined the Northeast Conference from Division II Northeast-10 Conference. The Warriors will not be eligible for the NEC Tournament until 2024.

Schedule and results

Note: Bracket is re-seeded after quarterfinal matchups, with highest remaining seed playing the lowest remaining seed in the semifinals.

Bracket and results
Teams are reseeded after each round with highest remaining seeds receiving home court advantage.

All-tournament team
Tournament MVP in bold.

See also

2020 Northeast Conference women's basketball tournament

References

Tournament
Northeast Conference men's basketball tournament
Northeast Conference men's basketball tournament